The 2016 ACB Playoffs was the postseason tournament of the ACB's 2015–16 season, which began October 10, 2015. The playoffs started on May 28, 2016, and ended with the Finals.

Bracket

Quarterfinals

FC Barcelona Lassa v Montakit Fuenlabrada

Real Madrid v UCAM Murcia

Valencia Basket v Unicaja

Laboral Kutxa Baskonia v Herbalife Gran Canaria

Semifinals

FC Barcelona Lassa v Laboral Kutxa Baskonia

Real Madrid v Valencia Basket

Finals

References

External links
Official website

2016
playoffs